Blairsville, Illinois may refer to the following places in the U.S. state of Illinois:
Blairsville, Hamilton County, Illinois, an unincorporated community
Blairsville, Williamson County, Illinois, an unincorporated community